In the mathematical study of the differential geometry of surfaces, the Bertrand–Diguet–Puiseux theorem expresses the Gaussian curvature of a surface in terms of the circumference of a geodesic circle, or the area of a geodesic disc.  The theorem is named for Joseph Bertrand, Victor Puiseux, and Charles François Diguet.

Let p be a point on a smooth surface M. The geodesic circle of radius r centered at p is the set of all points whose geodesic distance from p is equal to r. Let C(r) denote the circumference of this circle, and A(r) denote the area of the disc contained within the circle.  The Bertrand–Diguet–Puiseux theorem asserts that

 

The theorem is closely related to the Gauss–Bonnet theorem.

References

Differential geometry of surfaces
Theorems in differential geometry